RockShox Inc. is an American company founded by Paul Turner in 1989, that develops and manufactures bicycle suspensions. The company led in the development of mountain bikes. It is now part of SRAM Corporation.

History

Start
RockShox was founded by Paul Turner in 1989 in Asheville, North Carolina, USA. It moved to California four years later when Steve and Deborah Simons bought out Dia Compe.

Turner raced motorcycles in his teens. In 1977, at the age of 18, he established a company that sold motorcycle components. He later worked for the Honda Motor Company as factory mechanic for their professional motocross team. This put him in contact with designers of suspension systems for motorcycles and other motocross industry people.

Simons is a former motocross rider in his teens and early twenties and entrepreneur. He developed heat sinks for Koni shock absorbers to lower oil temperatures and then in 1974 he designed a shock absorber for the company that became Fox Racing Shox. He then established his own company Dynamic Enterprises which became Simons Inc. developing pneumatic upgrade kits for suspension forks. This led to his own fork design and manufacture. He had two patents on suspension forks, one which, for upside down forks, he licensed to motorcycle and suspension manufacturers.

In the late 1980s Paul began riding mountain bikes and with his motorcycle experience longed for suspension. Paul began developing the first bicycle suspension fork. In 1989 or 1990, Turner approached Simons for help designing a suspension fork for mountain bikes. Turner had in 1987, with the help of Keith Bontrager, presented a full bike with front and rear suspension at the bicycle industry trade show in Long Beach. The industry was not impressed. Two years later Turner and his wife Christi were manufacturing suspension forks in their garage with parts bought from Simons Inc, who later partnered Turner when Steve and his wife, Deborah, mortgaged their home to buy out Dia-Compe and move manufacturing to Mt. View, California in 1993. The R&D and Marketing groups remained in Boulder, Co. until moving to Mt. View, Ca in 1994 and then Santa Cruz in 1995.  Manufacturing and Engineering move to San Jose, Ca in 1995. They worked with Thomas Dooley at TDA in Boulder, CO who created the current RockShox logo, and was the creative director for all marketing and advertising.

Turner brought in Greg Herbold as a test rider and company spokesman. In 1990 Herbold became the first world champion in downhill mountain biking riding one of the first suspension forks for mountain bikes made. In August that year the company manufactured its first 100 suspension forks, the RS-1. The start-up was financed by the East Asian bike component manufacturer Dia-Compe, the founders, and other investors. Dia-Compe manufactured the next series of forks in addition to the original Aheadset, which the RS-1 utilised. Later Dia-Compe USA was bought out by Simons & Turner who disposed of its shares. From then the forks were primarily manufactured at RockShox in Mt.View, Ca.

In 1992 Turner & Simons, using the RockShox RS-1 design, created a private label fork for Specialized working with Mark Winter. Mark left Specialized a few years later, joining RockShox in 1995.

Growth and IPO
Eight years after inception the company manufactured and sold a million RockShox forks and had revenues of $100 million. The company went public in October 1996, was listed on the Nasdaq Stock Exchange (ticker: RSHX), and raised 65 million dollars ($72 million before deduction of IPO related costs). The company had 300 employees, most in the company's US factories. RockShox had a market share of 60 percent.

Competition and cost savings
Towards the end of the 1990s competition was fierce and profits were thin.

Rock Shox was one of many brands that marketed suspension forks for bicycles, others were Answer Manitou, Marzocchi and RST. During this time Fox Racing Shox also entered the bicycle industry. As the number of direct substitutes to Rock Shox's products increased, the company experienced difficulties in protecting its position as the leading manufacturer in the business.

In June 2000 RockShox moved production to Colorado Springs, which saved an estimated $5 million a year. In 2001 the company lost $10 million.

SRAM takeover
In 2002 RockShox defaulted on a loan to SRAM. SRAM took over the company and its debt obligations for $5.6 million. The company had 300 employees in Colorado Springs. In 2002, production in Colorado moved to Taichung, Taiwan. A small test facility remains in Colorado Springs.

Paul Turner has been nominated for the Mountain Bike Hall of Fame several times but declined.

Product chronology and common specifications
Suspension Forks

Other features:

There are usually several versions of each product, typically distinguished by the presence or absence of certain features, such as material type, preload, rebound damping, compression damping, lockout, remote lockout and replaceable bushings. This article does not attempt to list all specifications for all versions.

References
7. http://www.vintagerockshox.com/

Cycle manufacturers of the United States
Cycle suspension manufacturers
Companies based in Colorado Springs, Colorado
Manufacturing companies based in Colorado
Companies established in 1989
SRAM Corporation